The International League (IL) is a Minor League Baseball league that operates in the United States at the Triple-A level, which is one grade below Major League Baseball. A champion has been determined at the end of each season since the league was formed in 1884. 

Through 1932, champions were usually the regular-season pennant winners—the team with the best win–loss record at the conclusion of the season. From 1933 to 2020, postseason playoffs were held to determine champions. Participants from 1933 to 1987 were usually the four teams with the highest winning percentages. From 1988 to 2020, the four qualifiers were the division winners and one or two wild card teams. The winner of each season's playoffs was awarded the Governors' Cup. These playoffs and the issuing of trophy were discontinued in 2021, when the winner was the team with the best regular-season record. As of 2022, the league championship is determined by a single-game playoff at a neutral location between the East and West division winners, with the winner meeting the champion of the Pacific Coast League in the Triple-A National Championship Game.

The Rochester Red Wings have won 19 International League championships, more than any other team, followed by the Columbus Clippers (11) and the Baltimore Orioles, original Buffalo Bisons, and Toronto Maple Leafs (10). Among active IL franchises, Rochester has won 19 championships, the most of all teams, followed by Columbus (11) and the Durham Bulls and Syracuse Mets (8). During the era of the Governors' Cup playoffs from 1933 to 2020, the most cup titles were won by Columbus (11), followed by Rochester (10) and Syracuse (8).

History

Pre-playoff era (1884–1932)

The International League was founded in 1884. The modern circuit traces its roots from several predecessor leagues: the Eastern League (1884), New York State League (1885), International League (1886–1887), International Association (1888–1890), Eastern Association (1891), and Eastern League (1892–1911). It adopted consistent use of the International League name in 1912. After the cancellation of the 2020 season due to the COVID-19 pandemic, the league was known as the Triple-A East in 2021 before reverting to the International League moniker in 2022.

A league champion has been determined at the end of each season. With few exceptions, champions from 1884 to 1932 were simply the regular-season pennant winners—the team with the best win–loss record at the conclusion of the regular championship season. The first league champions were the Trenton Trentonians, who won by four games over the Lancaster Ironsides in 1884. The 1891 and 1892 seasons were contested as split seasons or "double seasons". Under this format, the schedule was split into two parts. The team with the best record at the end of the first season won the first pennant. Standings were then reset so that all clubs had clean records to begin the second season. If the same team won both seasons, they were declared the league champion. This was the case in 1891 when the original Buffalo Bisons won both halves. If a different team won the second season, the two winners would meet in a playoff series to determine the champion. This happened in 1892 when the Binghamton Bingoes, winners of the second season, defeated the Providence Clamdiggers, winners of the first season, four games to two. In 1932, the Newark Bears became the last team to win the championship by virtue of winning the regular-season pennant before a recurring series of playoffs were instituted.

Governors' Cup era (1933–2020)

Frank Shaughnessy, general manager of the International League's Montreal Royals, was interested in developing a way for multiple clubs to share in the excitement of postseason play. His new playoff format, devised to maintain the interest of fans and players alike during the Great Depression, provided an opportunity for four teams to compete for the league's championship. In 1933, he introduced his plan to league president Charles H. Knappe, and the result was the Governors' Cup playoffs. Several other leagues noticed the success of the "Shaughnessy Plan" and began using the system as well.

The governors of Maryland, New Jersey, and New York and the lieutenant governors of the provinces of Quebec and Ontario, in which the league's eight teams were located at the time, sponsored a trophy to be awarded annually to the winner of the International League playoffs. The original trophy, designed by the supervisor of the league's umpires and silversmith W. B. Carpenter, was created out of solid silver. In 1988, IL president Harold Cooper donated the trophy to the Baseball Hall of Fame in Cooperstown, New York, where it is on permanent display. A new trophy was minted in its place to be presented to the winner of the Governors' Cup playoffs.

Under this system, the top four teams in the league, based on winning percentage, competed for the championship. From 1933 to 1987, the first round typically consisted of a best-of-seven-games series between the first and fourth-place teams and a series between the second and third-place teams. The winners of these semifinals then faced one another for the championship in a best-of-seven series. The first Governors' Cup was won in 1933 by the original Buffalo Bisons, who defeated the Rochester Red Wings, 4–2. Sporadically from 1966 to 1980, one or both rounds were reduced to best-of-five series. From 1981 to 2020, both rounds were the best-of-five.

The IL utilized a divisional alignment for the first time in 1963. The first-place teams from each division, North and South, met in the first round, as did the second-place teams, with the winners meeting in the finals. The circuit reverted to having no divisions in 1964 but returned to the same playoff format with North and South Divisions for 1973 and 1974.

From 1988 to 1991, the International League held an interleague partnership with the American Association, called the Triple-A Alliance, in which they played an interlocking schedule, and the leagues' champions met in the Triple-A Classic. During this period, the IL was divided into East and West Divisions, and the division winners faced off in a best-of-five series to determine champions. After the dissolution of the Triple-A Alliance following the 1991 season, the International League maintained this divisional alignment but returned to having a semifinal round wherein the top two teams in each division played each other to qualify for the Governors' Cup finals.

The league was split into three divisions, North, South, and West, from 1998 to 2020. Under this arrangement, the three division winners and a wild card team (the team with the best second-place record) qualified for the playoffs. The best-of-five semifinals pitted the North Division winner against the wild card team, and the South and West Division winners against each other. The winners then played in a best-of-five round to determine the champion. The last team to win the championship this way was the Columbus Clippers, who won the last Governors' Cup in 2019. The 2020 season was canceled due to the COVID-19 pandemic.

Current era (2021–present)

The International League ceased operations before the 2021 season in conjunction with Major League Baseball's (MLB) reorganization of Minor League Baseball. In place of the International League, MLB created the Triple-A East, a circuit divided into three divisions, Northeast, Midwest, and Southeast. Prior to the 2022 season, MLB renamed the Triple-A East the International League, and it carried on the history of the IL prior to reorganization. Rather than hold playoffs for its championship, the Triple-A East's 2021 title was awarded to the team with the best regular-season record. The Durham Bulls won this championship by four-and-a-half games ahead of the Buffalo Bisons. Along with these changes, all references to the Governors' Cup as the championship of the International League were discontinued, and a different trophy was awarded in 2021. In 2022, the league was reorganized in East and West Divisions. Under this alignment, the winners of each division meet in a single game to determine the league champion.

Champions

Pre-playoff champions (1884–1932)

Governors' Cup champions (1933–2020)

2021–present

Wins by team

Active International League teams appear in bold.

Governors' Cup wins by team

See also

List of American Association champions
List of Pacific Coast League champions

Notes

References
Specific

General

Champions
International
International League champions
International League